Evrim is a Turkish given name for males or females. In Turkish, "Evrim" means "evolution".

People 
 Evrim Akyigit (born 1977), Turkish-born Dutch actress
 Evrim Demirel (born 1977), Turkish composer and jazz pianist
 Evrim Sağlam (born 1996), Turkish archer
 Ozan Evrim Özenç (born 1993), Turkish footballer

Turkish masculine given names
Turkish feminine given names